Sainte-Florence may refer to:
 Sainte-Florence, Gironde, France
 Sainte-Florence, Quebec, Canada
 Sainte-Florence, Vendée, France